The Palma River is a river of Tocantins state in central Brazil.

See also 
 List of rivers of Tocantins

References

External links 
 Brazilian Ministry of Transport

Rivers of Tocantins